SHE Media (formerly known as SheKnows Media) is an American digital media company. It operates the website properties BlogHer, SheKnows.com, STYLECASTER, and HelloFlo. It has been a brand of Penske Media Corporation since 2018.

History

SHE Media was founded as SheKnows.com in 1999 by Kyle Cox, Betsy Gartrell-Judd, and Nancy J. Price, as a subset of Price and Bailey's online media company Myria Media.. It was designed for "21st-century mothers" with blogs, videos, and articles about entertainment, lifestyle; and, parenting written by industry experts, journalists, and published authors. SheKnows.com was acquired by Evolve Media in 2012, which in turn sold it to Great Hill Partners. In 2014, it acquired #BlogHer and STYLECASTER. In 2016, it acquired HelloFlo, a website dedicated to women's health.

The company was acquired by Penske Media in March 2018 for $40 million. Samantha Skey was named CEO of the company in July of that year. SheKnows.com rebranded as SHE Media in November 2018. As of that date, it had 60 million unique monthly visitors.

Overview
SHE Media publishes entertainment, fashion, health, career, parenting, and food multi-media content. The SHE Media Partner Network offers bloggers and social media influencers a portfolio of monetization opportunities. SHE Media is the creator of the annual #Femvertising Awards, which pay recognition to brands and agencies that produce pro-female advertising. Its #BlogHer brand hosts a series of large conferences for women entrepreneurs and content creators each year.

Properties

SheKnows.com
SHE Media defines SheKnows.com as site dedicated to "providing women with the practical service they need and the daily inspiration they want to live full, authentic lives. As the flagship property of SHE Media, SheKnows.com’s editorial and branded content spans topics that include food, family, health, beauty, entertainment and more. The site was a Webby Best in Lifestyle Site honoree in 2017. In 2015, SheKnows.com received an OMMA Award in the Family/Parenting/Women’s Interest Category. In 2013, it was listed in Forbes’ Top Websites for Women list.

#BlogHer

On November 3, 2014, the company acquired #BlogHer, which brought a large network of women content creators and a legacy conference and events revenue stream to the business. The deal was estimated by Ad Age to be worth between $30 and $40 million. #BlogHer co-founders Jory Des Jardins, Elisa Camahort, and Lisa Stone joined SHE Media as executives. The merger offers #BlogHer customers access to SHE Media's multi-media resources and increased the company's share of the women's presence on the internet.

SHE Media describes #BlogHer events, which began in 2005, as “the place where female content creators and entrepreneurs connect, amplify their diverse voices, share authentic content, as well as explore opportunities to earn.” Today, it attracts thousands of social media influencers, bloggers, content creators, hand-raisers, industry thought leaders and brand executives each year. The conference series is regarded for its commitment to diversity. SHE Media commits to giving women of color 40% or more main-stage and breakout session speaking roles at every BlogHer conference. Past speakers have included Serena Williams, Kim Kardashian, Gwyneth Paltrow, Gabrielle Union, Amy Schumer, Jessica Alba, Chelsea Clinton, Carla Hall, Sheryl Crow, Martha Stewart, Ava DuVernay, Arianna Huffington, and more.

STYLECASTER
On August 15, 2014, SHE Media purchased STYLECASTER Media Group in Manhattan to broaden its customer base, to complement its existing market, and better target young, cosmopolitan, and fashion-forward women. It expected to realize $50 million in revenue from the combined organization, according to The Wall Street Journal, which reported that the $10 million purchase was an all-stock transaction. Founders Ari Goldberg and David Goldberg initially became part of the SheKnows organization. Editor-in-Chief Laurel Pinson also moved to SHE Media from STYLECASTER. The site was a Webby Award nominee and honoree for the Best Fashion & Beauty Site in 2015, 2016 and 2017.

HelloFlo 
In April 2016, SHE Media acquired HelloFlo, a website designed to normalize the conversation about women’s and girls' bodies at every stage of life and the creator of viral videos like "Camp Gyno", "First Moon Party" and "A Visit from Aunt Flo". In 2017, HelloFlo was the winner of a Webby Award for Best Health Site. That same year, it received an OMMA Award for Best Health/Wellness site.

The #Femvertising Awards 
The #Femvertising Awards, created by SHE Media, honor excellence in pro-female advertising. Based on a term now CEO Samantha Skey coined in an article published in MediaPost in 2014, SHE Media launched the #Femvertising Awards the following year to celebrate ads that challenge social and gender norms through advertising. Since 2015, the term Femvertising and the #Femvertising Awards have been covered by a variety of media outlets, including NBC Nightly News, Adweek, The Huffington Post and more.

Hatch 
SHE Media launched Hatch in 2015 to explore important social issues impacting Generation Z. The video workshops, created by teens and tweens to serve as a resource for parents, provide meaningful insights on topics that include social media anxiety, feminism, gender roles, cyberbullying, microaggressions and fake news.

Hatch has been published in news outlets that include CNN, TIME, AdWeek, Upworthy, Buzzfeed, and more. In October 2017, Good Morning America featured the Hatch #DigitalDetox workshop, in which a group of 12- and 13-year-olds who belong to the program shared what it was like to give up social media, online games, streaming video and texting for an entire week.

#ThePitch 
With the desire to “help change the ratio of women-run businesses,” SHE Media launched #ThePitch in 2015 to elevate female entrepreneurship and innovation and inspire a global community of women. #ThePitch is a live competition that spotlights up-and-coming women entrepreneurs and innovators, giving them the chance to explain their business ideas to a panel of judges at SHE Media’s BlogHer conferences. The winner of #ThePitch is ultimately selected via popular vote by conference attendees. Winners receive marketing support from SHE Media.

References

Further reading
 
 
 

Online publishing companies of the United States
Organizations established in 1999
Internet properties established in 1999
American women's websites
Penske Media Corporation
1999 establishments in the United States